Al-Dirah, pronounced as ad-Dirah and alternatively transliterated as Dheera, Deirah, Deerah or Deera, is a neighborhood and a subject of Baladiyah al-Batha in southern Riyadh, Saudi Arabia, located south of al-Futah and west of al-Marqab. Forming the kernel of the old city region enclosed within the former city walls, it is widely considered to be the antecedent to modern Riyadh since the metropolis outgrew as an offshoot of the walled town in the 1950s.   

Named after Deirah markets, it is today a popular tourist attraction as it hosts several historical and traditional landmarks, such as the Justice Palace (Qasr al-Hukm), al-Masmak Fort, and Deera Square. The origins of the neighborhood can be traced back to 1747 when Deham bin Dawas al-Shalaan constructed the Qasr al-Hukm in the walled town.

In popular culture
 Baby (2015), a fictional city in Saudi Arabia named Al Dera which hosts the Chop Chop Square.

References

Neighbourhoods in Riyadh